"Lady Killer" is the fifth single from Canadian/Jamaican singer Kreesha Turner's debut studio album Passion. The single remained in the Canadian Hot 100 for thirteen consecutive weeks in the year of 2008.

Music video
The music video for 'Lady Killer' was shot early spring 2009, in Havana, Cuba. It was uploaded to Kreesha's official YouTube channel on May 4, 2009. Directed by Aaron A, the video features Kreesha walking around balcony's in Havana, and at a club with heavy, dark make-up.

Charts

References

2008 singles
Kreesha Turner songs
Music videos directed by Aaron A
2007 songs
Songs written by Jon Levine
EMI Records singles
Songs written by Kreesha Turner